Moving Units is the first release by the band of the same name, Moving Units. It was first released early 2002 on Festival Of Dead Deer's former label, Three One G, in 12" vinyl; the first pressing was on pink vinyl and the second on green. After the band moved to Palm Records, it was reissued on February 4, 2003, on CD.

Track listing
"Between Us & Them"
"X and Y"
"I Am"
"Melodrama"

External links
Official site
Site @ Palm Pictures

Moving Units albums
2002 EPs